Philippe Guerdat (born 21 April 1952) is a Swiss former equestrian. He competed at the 1984 Summer Olympics and the 1988 Summer Olympics.

References

External links
 

1952 births
Living people
Swiss male equestrians
Olympic equestrians of Switzerland
Equestrians at the 1984 Summer Olympics
Equestrians at the 1988 Summer Olympics
People from Delémont District
Sportspeople from the canton of Jura
20th-century Swiss people